WXEX (1540 kHz) is a commercial AM radio station licensed to Exeter, New Hampshire, and covering the New Hampshire Seacoast region and Southern Maine.  The station airs an oldies radio format.  The station's license is held by Port Broadcasting LLC. The station simulcasts its sister station, 92.1 WXEX-FM in Sanford, Maine.  In addition, listeners can tune in the station's FM translator at 97.1 MHz, W246BP, also based in Exeter, which offers another simulcast of WXEX.

AM 1540 is a clear-channel frequency reserved for Class A stations KXEL in Waterloo, Iowa and ZNS-1 in Nassau, Bahamas.  So WXEX severely lowers its power at night.  By day the station broadcasts at 5,000 watts.  But at night, the power is only three watts.

History
The AM 1540 frequency in Exeter went on the air on June 4, 1966, as WKXR.  It was owned by Frank Estes, who also owned WKXL in Concord, New Hampshire.  Estes sold the station in 1978, and on March 10, 1982, the station was renamed WMYF. Those call letters stood for "The Music of Your Life," a syndicated adult standards format.

In 1998, Capstar acquired WMYF from CBS Radio. (CBS had obtained the station after its purchase of American Radio Systems.)  The station began to simulcast the news/talk format of 610 WGIR, a sister station in Manchester, New Hampshire. A call change to WGIP followed on October 2. The WMYF call letters would later be moved down the AM dial to 1380, where they remained until 2016.  That station is now WPLA.

After WGIP was placed into the Aloha Station Trust in 2008 as a result of the privatization of Clear Channel Communications Clear Channel (today iHeartMedia, Inc.) acquired the station after several mergers.  The station was sold to Aruba Capital Holdings, LLC in 2009.  After Aruba closed on the sale on March 9, 2009, the call letters were changed to WXEX and the WGIR simulcast was discontinued. WXEX relaunched with an oldies format on March 16, 2009. On August 11, 2011, the station began simulcasting with 92.1 WXEX-FM in Sanford, Maine, which Aruba had acquired earlier in the year.

On April 14, 2015, WXEX owner Aruba Capital Holdings LLC entered into a local marketing agreement (LMA) with WNBP/WWSF owner Port Broadcasting LLC whereby the latter assumed operational control of WXEX and WXEX-FM. On August 20, 2015, WXEX and its FM sister station shifted their format from classic hits to classic rock, branded as "Classic Rock 92.1"; the move was made to distinguish WXEX from WWSF's oldies format. Effective January 31, 2017, Aruba Capital sold WXEX, WXEX-FM, and W246BP to LMA partner Port Broadcasting. In return, Aruba Capital received a 26.9% stake in Port Broadcasting, giving Aruba Capital principal Andrew Hartman a controlling interest in the new licensee.

During Labor Day Weekend in 2018, WXEX and WXEX-FM stunted with a broadcast of the Drake-Chenault documentary The History of Rock and Roll. On September 3, 2018, the stations changed to an oldies format, branded as Seacoast Oldies, in effect reversing the 2015 format change.

References

External links

XEX (AM)
Radio stations established in 1966
1966 establishments in New Hampshire
Oldies radio stations in the United States
Exeter, New Hampshire